Love on the Run may refer to:

Film
 Love on the Run (1936 film), starring Clark Gable and Joan Crawford 
 Love on the Run (1979 film), a French film directed by François Truffaut
 Love on the Run (1985 film), a made-for-television film starring Alec Baldwin
 Love on the Run (1994 film), an American TV film
 Love on the Run (2016 film), starring Annaleigh Ashford

Music
 "Love on the Run" (song), a 2003 song by Chicane
 "Love on the Run", a song by Scorpions, from the 1988 album Savage Amusement

Television
 Love on the Run (TV series), an Indian series featuring Saanvi Talwar
 "Love on the Run", an episode of the television comedy Diff'rent Strokes
 "Love on the Run", an episode of the television comedy Major Dad